Andy Bean (born October 7, 1984) is an American actor. He is known for his roles as Alec Holland in DC Universe's Swamp Thing, Greg Knox in Power, Henry Bergen in Here and Now and as Stanley Uris in It Chapter Two.

Career
Bean co-starred as Greg Knox in the drama series Power, an FBI agent assigned to the Ghost case and Angela Valdes' former love interest. He played the role of Henry Bergen, a homeless thief, in Here and Now (2018).

In his first major movie role, Bean played Spike, a physicist trying to attempt teleportation, in Bad Vegan and the Teleportation Machine (2016), and also had minor roles in Allegiant (2016) and Transformers: The Last Knight (2017). He was cast, in 2019, as Alec Holland in DC Universe's Swamp Thing, which ran for one season. In 2019, Bean played the role of adult Stanley Uris in It Chapter Two, sharing the character with Wyatt Oleff.

Personal life
On November 17, 2019, he and his wife welcomed their first child, a girl named Penelope Bean.

Filmography

Film

Television

References

External links

 

Living people
1984 births
Male actors from Chicago
Male actors from Texas
People from Carrollton, Texas